Albert VI may refer to:

 Albert VI, Archduke of Austria (1418–1463)
 Albert VI, Prince of Anhalt-Köthen (died 1475)
 Albert VI, Duke of Mecklenburg (1438–1483)
 Albert VI, Duke of Bavaria (1584–1666)

de:Liste der Herrscher namens Albrecht#Albrecht VI.